Jordan Lee Tripp (born April 3, 1991) is a former American football inside linebacker. He was drafted by the Miami Dolphins in the fifth round of the 2014 NFL Draft. He played college football at Montana.

High school
Tripp attended Big Sky High School in Missoula, Montana, where he was a team captain in football his senior year. He was an all-state and all-conference pick as a senior when he had 72 tackles, including 13 for loss, and 12 sacks.

College career
Tripp attended the University of Montana and played for the Montana Grizzlies football team from 2009 to 2013. While playing at the University of Montana, Tripp was teammates with future NFL linebacker Brock Coyle and cornerback Trumaine Johnson (cornerback).

As a true freshman in 2009, playing in a back-up role, he played in all 15 games, recording 23 tackles, and recovering two fumbles, best for second on the team.

He started all 11 games in 2010 and finished second on the team with 99 tackles. He recorded nine tackles for loss, and led the team with three fumbles recoveries.

He started in the first three games of the 2011 season, but was injured against Eastern Washington. He suffered an injury to his shoulder than resulted in him being out for the remainder of the season. He finished the season with 18 tackles, including 1.5 for loss, three pass break-ups, and one fumble recovery. He was granted a medical redshirt after the season.

He started all 11 games in 2012, finishing second on the team with 95 tackles, a team leading 13.5 tackles for loss, 5.5 sacks, one interception for 58 yards, and four forced fumbles. He also returned a fumble 80 yards for a touchdown against Idaho State. His season lead him to being named a first-team All-Big Sky selection, and third-team FCS All-American by the Associated Press.

Prior to the start of the 2013 season, Tripp was named the Big Sky Conference Preseason Defensive MVP. He started all 13 games, recording a career-high 100 tackles, including 5.5 for loss, two sacks, and three interceptions. He recovered three fumbles, one in the endzone against Portland State for a touchdown. He also blocked a field goal late in Montana's 21-14 overtime victory over Cal Poly. After the season, Tripp was named a first-team All-Big Sky selection for the second consecutive season, and was named a first-team FCS All-American by the Associated Press.

Statistics

Professional career

Miami Dolphins
Tripp was drafted by the Miami Dolphins in the fifth round (171st overall) of the 2014 NFL Draft. He was released by the Dolphins on September 5, 2015 during final roster cuts.

Jacksonville Jaguars
On October 10, 2015, Tripp was signed by the Jacksonville Jaguars. Tripp earned his first career start on December 13, 2015 against the Colts and recorded four tackles.

On September 3, 2016, Tripp was released by the Jaguars.

Seattle Seahawks
On September 5, 2016, Tripp was signed to the Seahawks' practice squad. He was promoted to the active roster on October 3, 2016. He was placed on injured reserve on December 3, 2016. He was waived on December 9, 2016.

Green Bay Packers

On December 14, 2016, Tripp was signed by the Green Bay Packers.

He re-signed with the Packers on March 15, 2017. He was waived on September 2, 2017.

Atlanta Falcons
On September 5, 2017, Tripp signed with the Atlanta Falcons. He was placed on injured reserve on October 31, 2017 with a concussion.

Statistics

Personal life
He was a third generation football player at Montana. His father, Bryan, was a starting linebacker for the Grizzlies in 1989 and 1990, while his grandfather, Gene, played and lettered at Montana in 1963-64.

References

External links
Montana Grizzlies bio

1991 births
Living people
Players of American football from Montana
Sportspeople from Missoula, Montana
American football linebackers
Montana Grizzlies football players
Miami Dolphins players
Jacksonville Jaguars players
Seattle Seahawks players
Green Bay Packers players
Atlanta Falcons players